The following are the results of the 50 metre rifle prone competition at the 1972 Summer Olympics.  The gold medal was won by Ri Ho-jun of North Korea, this was the first ever medal for a North Korean athlete at the Summer Olympics.  It appeared that Vic Auer from the United States won the gold with 598.  After a “review” the official scores were announced and the judges gave Li 599 for the gold medal.

Final
The format was: 50 metres prone.  60 shots in prone position.   For a possible score of 600.  All ties are broken by the best score in the sixth stage, if still tied it goes to the fifth stage and continues until the tie is broken.

References

External links
Official report pg. 233

Shooting at the 1972 Summer Olympics
Men's 050m prone 1972